Keith Hackney (born 1958 in Roselle, Illinois) is a retired American mixed martial arts fighter. He competed in three Ultimate Fighting Championship tournaments.

Biography
Hackney started training martial arts at the age 11 by learning Wrestling and Boxing Two years later he began learning the art of Taekwondo and eventually received a second degree black belt. He also holds a second degree black belt in Tang Soo Do. In 1990, he furthered his martial arts training by beginning to train White Tiger Kenpo Karate, eventually earning a fourth degree black belt.

In 1994, Hackney would start training in Jujutsu and Submission Fighting. And was contacted by Art Davie for the Ultimate Fighting Championship. He was slated to compete at the UFC 3 tournament, where he entered as an alternate to one of the original players. In his first match, Hackney faced 616-lb sumo champion Emmanuel Yarborough, but he overcame the size difference by attacking fast and aggressively, knocking Yarborough down with a palm strike. Yarborough got up and pushed Hackney through the cage door, but once the fight was restarted, Keith followed with a flurry of punches to the top and back of the head, making the referee stop the fight. Hackney left the cage with an injured wrist, however, and was forced to abandon the tournament.

Hackney returned at UFC 4, where he faced Joe Son in a fight made infamous by the UFC rule from the time which allowed groin strikes. Keith was taken down and endangered with a guillotine choke, but he resorted to repeatedly punching Son's groin in order to make him release the hold. After several blows, Hackney repositioned himself over Son and applied a blood choke, prompting Son to tap out. The kenpo practitioner advanced in the tournament, going on to face UFC 1 and 2 winner Royce Gracie at the next round.

Pitted against Royce, Hackney managed to resist some initial takedowns, even getting a clean sprawl in an instance, and landed multiple shots through the attempts. After exchanging knees, Gracie pulled guard and attempted a triangle choke, only for Hackney to stand and land a right hand which marked Royce's face. At the end, however, Royce got the armbar and made him tap out.

His last MMA fight would be at the event Ultimate Ultimate 1995, where he fought Marco Ruas in a losing effort.

Hackney has appeared in two movies: as an actor in Superfights and doing stunts in Cut.

Mixed martial arts record

|-
|Loss
|align=center|2–2
|Marco Ruas
|Submission (rear-naked choke)
|Ultimate Ultimate 1995
|
|align=center|1
|align=center|2:39
|Denver, Colorado, United States
|
|-
|Loss
|align=center|2–1
|Royce Gracie
|Submission (armbar)
|rowspan=2|UFC 4
|rowspan=2|
|align=center|1
|align=center|5:32
|rowspan=2|Tulsa, Oklahoma, United States
|
|-
|Win
|align=center|2–0
|Joe Son
|Submission (choke)
|align=center|1
|align=center|2:44
|
|-
|Win
|align=center|1–0
|Emmanuel Yarborough
|TKO (punches)
|UFC 3
|
|align=center|1
|align=center|1:59
|Charlotte, North Carolina, United States
|

Reference list

External links

1958 births
American male karateka
American male taekwondo practitioners
American tang soo do practitioners
American male mixed martial artists
Mixed martial artists utilizing American Kenpo
Mixed martial artists utilizing taekwondo
Mixed martial artists utilizing Tang Soo Do
People from Roselle, Illinois
Ultimate Fighting Championship male fighters
Living people